Blastobasis sprotundalis is a moth in the family Blastobasidae. It was described by Kyu-Tek Park in 1984. It is found in Russia and Japan.

References

Blastobasis
Moths described in 1984